Cignal HD Spikers may refer to:
 Cignal HD Spikers (men's team), Filipino men's volleyball team
 Cignal HD Spikers (women's team), Filipino women's volleyball team